Emma Neale (born 2 January 1969) is a novelist and poet from New Zealand.

Background 

Neale was born in Dunedin and grew up in Christchurch, San Diego, and Wellington. She received her undergraduate degree from Victoria University of Wellington and was awarded an MA and PhD from University College London. Following her graduation she returned to New Zealand to work for Longacre Press, working for ten years as editor then senior editor.

Works 
Neale's first work was published in 1998 and her writing has been featured extensively in magazines, newspapers and journals, and several anthologies.

Novels 
 Night Swimming (Penguin Random House, 1998)
 Little Moon (Random House, 2001)
 Double Take (Random House, 2003)
 Relative Strangers (Vintage, 2006)
 Fosterling (Vintage, 2011)
 Billy Bird (Penguin Random House, 2016)

Poetry 
 Sleeve-Notes (Random House, 1999)
 How to Make a Million (Godwit, 2002)
 Spark (Steele Roberts, 2008)
 The Truth Garden (Otago University Press, 2012)
 Tender Machines (Otago University Press, 2015)
 To the Occupant (Otago University Press, 2019)
 Poems included in the Best New Zealand Poems series (2002, 2007, 2009 & 2014)

Editorial 
Neale has served as editor for:
 Creative Juices (Flamingo, 2003)
 Best New Zealand Poems (Victoria University of Wellington, 2004)
 Swings and Roundabouts (Godwit, 2008)
 Manifesto Aotearoa: 101 Political Poems (Otago University Press, 2017)
In October, 2017, Neale was appointed editor of Landfall, a literary journal published by Otago University Press.

Awards 
Neale's work has been awarded and nominated for several literary prizes including:
 Ockham New Zealand Book Awards, Acorn Foundation Fiction Prize (2017) shortlisted for Billy Bird
 Ockham New Zealand Book Awards (2016) longlisted for Tender Machines
Sarah Broom Poetry Prize (2014), poetry included in the shortlist
 Sir Julius Vogel Award youth category (2011) shortlisted for Fosterling
 Kathleen Grattan Award for poetry (2011) awarded to The Truth Garden
 Takahe Poetry Competition (2008), first place for the poem 'Well'
NZSA Janet Frame Memorial Award for Literature (2008)

Residencies and fellowships 
In 2012 she was awarded the Robert Burns Fellowship, a literary residency at the University of Otago in Dunedin, New Zealand. She has also been awarded the Todd/Creative New Zealand New Writers Bursary (2000), the Peter & Dianne Beatson Fellowship (2014), and was a University of Otago/Sir James Wallace Pah Homestead Fellow.

References

Further reading 
 Interview with Emma Neale by 13th Floor
 Flying Dreams: A Conversation with Emma Neale

External links 
 Official website
 Poetry on NZ Poet Laureate

Living people
1969 births
New Zealand women novelists
New Zealand women poets
Writers from Dunedin
Alumni of University College London
Victoria University of Wellington alumni
20th-century New Zealand novelists
20th-century New Zealand poets
20th-century New Zealand women writers
21st-century New Zealand novelists
21st-century New Zealand poets
21st-century New Zealand women writers